The WWS-3 Delphin (Dolphin) was a single-seat glider designed and built in Poland from  1936.

Development 
To provide a higher performance glider, to complement the W.W.S.1 Salamandra and W.W.S.2 Żaba, Wacław Czerwiński designed an all wood glider with smooth lines derived from wind tunnel tests at the Lwów Technical University. With a stiff structure optimised for higher speeds the W.W.S.3 had pleasant flying characteristics. The first prototype was built with two alternative tailplanes, one conventional with separate elevator, the other an all-flying surface, both of which were evaluated in airworthiness trials at the I.B.T.L. (Instytut Badań Technicznych Lotnictwa – Institute of Aviation Technical Research) during 1937. Production aircraft were produced at W.W.S and at L.W.L.(Lwówskie Warsztaty Lotnicze – Lwów Aviation Workshops) with the all-flying tail for pitch control.

The cantilever gull wings were constructed as a divided pair, with diagonal supplementary spars and plywood skinned leading edge D torsion box. The fuselage was constructed as a semi-monocoque shell, with integral fin carrying the rudder and all-flying tailplane. A pneumatically-sprung nose skid formed the undercarriage.

Production continued until the outbreak of World War II, with most aircraft being destroyed except for examples confiscated by the German and Soviet authorities. One example taken by German forces was left behind in Denmark at the end of the war, and refurbished for the Stamgruppen Gliding Club (regn OY-DYX), where it flew for several years.

Specifications (WWS-3 Delphin)

See also

References

  Taylor, J. H. (ed) (1989) Jane's Encyclopedia of Aviation. Studio Editions: London. p. 29
Simons, Martin. Sailplanes 1920-1945 2nd revised edition. EQIP Werbung und Verlag G.m.b.H.. Königswinter. 2006. 
Cynk, Jerzy B. Polish Aircraft 1893–1939. London, Putnam. 1971.

External links

http://www.piotrp.de/SZYBOWCE/pwws3.htm

1930s Polish sailplanes
High-wing aircraft
Aircraft first flown in 1936
Gull-wing aircraft